Mohamed Selim Soheim (born 7 July 1947) is an Egyptian boxer. He competed at the 1968 Summer Olympics and the 1972 Summer Olympics.

References

1947 births
Living people
Egyptian male boxers
Olympic boxers of Egypt
Boxers at the 1968 Summer Olympics
Boxers at the 1972 Summer Olympics
Sportspeople from Cairo
Flyweight boxers
20th-century Egyptian people